Spilarctia punctata is a moth in the family Erebidae. It was described by Frederic Moore in 1859. It is found in India (Sikkim, Assam, Nagaland) in Myanmar and on Java and possibly Borneo.

References

Moths described in 1859
punctata